Thanyakon Khrongpha (Some sources Thanyakorn)(born 3 June 1990) is a Thai professional golfer.

Khrongpha was a successful amateur, winning gold at the Southeast Asian Games, before turning professional in 2010. He promptly won his first professional tournament on the Asian Development Tour at the Kariza Classic in Indonesia. At the end of the year Khrongpha came through the qualifying school to earn a card for the full Asian Tour.

In his first season on the main tour, Khrongpha made 13 of 14 cuts and finished 52nd on the Order of Merit, enough to retain his card for 2012.

Professional wins (8)

Japan Golf Tour wins (1)

Asian Development Tour wins (1)

All Thailand Golf Tour wins (2)

ASEAN PGA Tour wins (2)

Thailand PGA Tour wins (2)

Team appearances
Southeast Asian Games (representing Thailand): 2007 (winners), 2009 (winners)

References

External links

Thanyakon Khrongpha
Asian Tour golfers
Japan Golf Tour golfers
Southeast Asian Games medalists in golf
Thanyakon Khrongpha
Competitors at the 2009 Southeast Asian Games
1990 births
Living people